Zophopetes ganda, the small palm nightfighter, is a butterfly in the family Hesperiidae. It is found in Ivory Coast, Ghana, Togo, Nigeria, Cameroon, Gabon, the Central African Republic, Uganda and north-western Tanzania. The habitat consists of forests, but may also be found in more open areas if the correct palm host plants are present.

References

Butterflies described in 1937
Erionotini